The South Puyallup River Bridge was built in 1930–31 in Mount Rainier National Park as part of the West Side Road project, planned to link the park's Nisqually and Carbon River entrances. The stone-faced reinforced concrete bridge was designed by the National Park Service and the Bureau of Public Roads.

The bridge was placed on the National Register of Historic Places on March 13, 1991. It is part of the Mount Rainier National Historic Landmark District, which encompasses the entire park and which recognizes the park's inventory of Park Service-designed rustic architecture.

See also
List of bridges documented by the Historic American Engineering Record in Washington (state)

References

External links

Road bridges on the National Register of Historic Places in Washington (state)
Bridges completed in 1931
Arch bridges in the United States
National Park Service rustic in Washington (state)
Buildings and structures in Mount Rainier National Park
Bridges in Pierce County, Washington
Historic American Engineering Record in Washington (state)
National Register of Historic Places in Mount Rainier National Park
Bridges over the Puyallup River
Concrete bridges in the United States
Stone bridges in the United States
1931 establishments in Washington (state)